Trichoplites albimaculosa is a species of moth of the family Geometridae first described by Hiroshi Inoue in 1978. It is found in Taiwan.

References

Moths described in 1978
Larentiinae